{{infobox road
| country = PAK
| type = M
| route = 4
| alternate_name = 
| maint = National Highway Authority
| map = 
| length_km = 309
| length_ref = 
| established = 2019
| history = 2003
| direction_a = North
| direction_b = South
| terminus_a =  Pindi Bhattian
| terminus_b =  Multan| junction =  Abdul Hakeem| cities = 
| ahn = 
}}

The M4''' is a north–south motorway in Pakistan that connects the cities of Faisalabad and Multan. The 309 km motorway also connects to the  M2, M3 and M5 motorways.

History 
The M4 Motorway was planned as part of Pakistan's Motorway Network from Faisalabad to Multan. The ground breaking ceremony of the project was carried out by then president of pakistan parveez Musharraf in 2007. At that time already constructed motorway from Faisalabad to Pindi Bhattian was named as M3 Motorway, sometimes it was referred to as shortest motorway of Pakistan. However, in 2013, when Mian Muhammad Nawaz Sharif became Prime Minister of Pakistan, another motorway from Lahore to Darkhana (Abdul Hakeem) was planned under CPEC to provide an alternate route for traffic coming to & from Lahore, bounded for Multan & subsequently up till Karachi so as to avoid/ reduce congestion over already existing N-5. This new motorway was designated as M3 Motorway (Lahore Abdul Hakeem Motorway) & the previously named M3 Motorway (Pindi Bhattian to Faisalabad) was merged with Faisalabad Multan Motorway & the entire stretch from Pindi Bhattian to Multan was named as M4 Motorway (Pindi Bhattian- Faisalabad- Multan Motorway).

Inauguration 
The M4 Motorway (Faisalabad to Multan section) was inaugurated in parts, first being Faisalabad to Gojra, second was Multan to Khanewal (Shamkot), third being Gojra to Shorkot, fourth was Shorkot to Abdul Hakeem ( Shorkot to Abdul Hakeem became operational almost together with Lahore Abdul Hakeem (Darkhana) Motorway) & finally Abdul Hakim (Deen Pur) to Khanewal (Shamkot). The last section of M4 Motorway (Abdul Hakeem to Khanewal) was inaugurated by the Foreign Minister of Pakistan Makhdoom Shah Mahmood Qureshi. The M4 Motorway was completed successfully by the end of 2019.

Pindi Bahttian to Faisalabad section of M4 Motorway was inaugurated in Year 2003.

Route 
The M4 begins near the M2 Pindi Bhattian Interchange and continues on a southwest course connecting the cities of Faisalabad, Gojra, Toba Tek Singh, Shorkot, Abdul Hakeem, Khanewal and Multan. And ends at Sher Shah Interachange giving exit to Multan Cantt over Shujabaad Road & itself continues as M5 Multan-Sukkur Motorway. It is connected to M3 Motorway (Lahore to Abdul Hakeem Motorway) near a village named Darkhana a few kilometers northeast of Abdul Hakeem Interchange. There is a separate Toll Plaza for Entrance/ Exit to/ from M3 Motorway.

Throughout its route, it passes mainly through the Agricultural Lands of Central Punjab.

Railway Line
M4 route is almost parallel to Railway Line till Faisalabad i.e. from Multan to Khanewal. The railway line runs along the left side of Motorway with an overhead bridge of Motorway for Railway crossing near Shamkot village. Then onwards, the Railway Line runs parallel to the right of motorway till Faisalabad, although the railway line might not be clearly visible from this motorway.

River Ravi
M4 Motorway crosses River Ravi in between Abdul Hakeem Interchange & Darkhana (M4, M3 Junction) Interchange.

Junctions and interchanges

References

M04
Toll roads in Pakistan